Tan Sri Datuk Dzulkifli bin Ahmad (Jawi: ذو الكفل  بن احمد) is the third and former chief commissioner of the Malaysian Anti-Corruption Commission (MACC).

Education
Dzulkifli graduated from the International Islamic University Malaysia (IIUM) with a Bachelor of Laws (Honours) (LL.B. (Hons.)).

Career
Prior to his appointment as MACC's chief commissioner, Dzulkifli served as the head of the anti-money laundering unit and subsequently National Revenue Recovery Enforcement in Malaysia's Attorney General's Chambers.

Dzulkifli tendered his resignation as MACC chief commissioner effective 14 May 2018.

Subsequently, he featured as one of the principal players in a set of audio recordings made public at a press conference by the Malaysian Anti-Corruption Commission on 8 January 2020 with regards to telephone conversations relating to alleged efforts to sabotage investigations into the 1Malaysia Development Berhad scandal.

Honours
  :
  Commander of the Order of Loyalty to the Crown of Malaysia (PSM) - Tan Sri (2017)
  :
  Companion Class II of the Order of Malacca (DPSM) - Datuk (2015)

References

Living people
People from Penang
Malaysian people of Malay descent
Malaysian Muslims
21st-century Malaysian lawyers
Commanders of the Order of Loyalty to the Crown of Malaysia
International Islamic University Malaysia alumni
Year of birth missing (living people)